The Macau national badminton team represents Macau SAR, China in international badminton team competitions. Macau participated in the 2019 Badminton Asia Mixed Team Championships, also known as the Tong Yun Kai Cup. They were eliminated in the group stage.

Macau also participated in the 2019 Sudirman Cup and got placed into Group 4 with Kazakhstan and Greenland. They finished in 29th place.

Participation in BWF competitions 
 Sudirman Cup

Participation in Asia Championships 
 Mixed team

Participation in East Asian Games 
The Macanese team participated in the now defunct East Asian Games and have won a gold medal in badminton at the Games.

Men's team

Women's team

Players 

Men
Ao Fei Long
Iek U Ieong
Leong Iok Chong
Pui Chi Chon
Pui Pang Fong

Women
Ao I Kuan
Gong Xue Xin
Kuan Chi Leng
Ng Weng Chi
Pui Chi Wa

References 

Badminton
National badminton teams
Badminton in Macau